Corporación Peñalolén is a Chilean football club based in Peñalolén. They currently play in the fourth level of Chilean football, the Tercera División B.

The club were founded on January 11, 2007 and participated for 3 years in Tercera División A and 2 years in Tercera División B.

Seasons played
3 seasons in Tercera División A
2 seasons in Tercera División B

See also
Chilean football league system

External links
Team webpage at Tercera Division.cl

Penalolen
Penalolen
2007 establishments in Chile